Midtgulen is a fjord in Bremanger Municipality in Vestland county, Norway. It is a branch southwards off the main Gulen fjord. The fjord is the middle of the three branches of Gulen; the other two are Nordgulen and Sørgulen. The Midtgulen Church is located at the northeastern side of the mouth of the fjord.

References

Fjords of Vestland
Bremanger